Nina Lvovna Khrushcheva (/xrʊ.ˈɕo.və/) is a Russian professor who defected to United States after the fall of Soviet Union  currently working as a professor of International Affairs at The New School in New York City, and a Contributing Editor to Project Syndicate: Association of Newspapers Around the World a funded project under the aegis Open Society Foundation  .

Family
Khrushcheva was born in 1964 in Moscow, Russian SFSR, and is the great-granddaughter (and adoptive granddaughter) of former leader of the Soviet Union Nikita Khrushchev. When Khrushchev's son Leonid died in World War II, Nikita adopted Leonid's two-year-old daughter, Julia, who later became Nina's mother. Khrushcheva's father, Lev Petrov, died in 1970 at age 47.

Education
Khrushcheva received a degree from Moscow State University in Russia, with a major in Russian in 1987, and a Ph.D. in Comparative Literature from Princeton University in New Jersey, in 1998.

Career
From 2002 to 2004, Khrushcheva was an Adjunct Assistant Professor at the School of International and Public Affairs, Columbia University in New York. Khrushcheva is currently a Professor of International Affairs in the graduate program at The New School in New York.

Khrushcheva is the author of numerous articles, director of the Russia Project at the World Policy Institute, contributor to Project Syndicate: Association of Newspapers Around the World, and editor of Project Syndicate's Russia column. Her articles have appeared in Newsweek, The New York Times, The Wall Street Journal, the Financial Times and other publications.

She had a two-year research appointment at the School of Historical Studies of Institute for Advanced Study in Princeton and then served as Deputy Editor of East European Constitutional Review at NYU School of Law. She is a member of the Council on Foreign Relations and a recipient of Great Immigrants: The Pride of America Award from Carnegie Corporation of New York.

She is the author of Imagining Nabokov: Russia Between Art and Politics (Yale UP, 2008) and The Lost Khrushchev: A Journey into the Gulag of the Russian Mind (Tate, 2014), and co-author of In Putin's Footsteps: Searching for the Soul of an Empire Across Russia's Eleven Time Zones (St. Martin's Press, 2019).

In March 2022, Khrushcheva expressed outrage at Vladimir Putin's conduct in the war that he waged against Ukraine, saying that her grandfather would have found Putin's conduct to be "despicable". In October 2022, she said, alluding to George Orwell's novel 1984, that in "Putin’s Russia, war is peace, slavery is freedom, ignorance is strength and illegally annexing a sovereign country’s territory is fighting colonialism."

Work
 
 The Lost Khrushchev: A Journey Into the Gulag of the Russian Mind. Tate Publishing & Enterprises. 2014. .
 In Putin's Footsteps: Searching for the Soul of an Empire Across Russia's Eleven Time Zones. St. Martin's Press. 2019. .

References

External links

 
 "The Mysteries of Political Strategy"
 Brezhnev, Bush and Baghdad 
 New School profile

1963 births
Living people
Russian emigrants to the United States
Columbia University faculty
The New School faculty
Princeton University alumni
Khrushchev family
Moscow State University alumni
Russian activists against the 2022 Russian invasion of Ukraine